Russia sent a delegation to compete at the 2008 Summer Paralympics in Beijing, China that won a total of 63 medals: 18 gold, 23 silver and 22 bronze.

Medallists

Sports

Archery

Men

|-
|align=left|Timur Tuchinov
|align=left|Men's individual recurve
|606
|8
|Bye
|L 97-98
|colspan=4|did not advance
|}

Athletics

Men's track

Men's field

Women's track

Women's field

Equestrian

Football 7-a-side

The men's football 7-a-side team won the silver medal after losing to Ukraine in the gold medal match.

Players
Pavel Borisov
Alexey Chesmin
Mamuka Dzimistarishvili
Stanislav Kolykhalov
Andrey Kuvaev
Alexander Lekov
Andrey Lozhechnikov
Lasha Murvandze
Georgy Nadzharyan
Ivan Potekhin
Oleg Smirnov
Aleksey Tumakov

Tournament

Semifinals

Gold medal match

Judo

Men

Women

Powerlifting

Men

Women

Rowing

Shooting

Men

Women

Swimming

Men

Women

Table tennis

Men

Women

Teams

Volleyball

Men's tournament
The men's team won the bronze medal after defeating Egypt in the bronze medal match.
Players
Alexander Baychik
Tanatkan Bukin
Dimitriy Gordiyenko
Evgeny Kuzovnikov
Andreu Lavrinovich
Viktor Milenin
Sergey Pozdeev
Maksim Timchenko
Sergey Uporov
Alexey Volkov
Sergey Yakunin

Group A matches

Semifinals

Bronze medal match

Wheelchair fencing

Men

Women

Wheelchair tennis

Men

See also
Russia at the Paralympics
Russia at the 2008 Summer Olympics

External links
International Paralympic Committee

References 

Nations at the 2008 Summer Paralympics
2008
Summer Paralympics